Wrangell–Saint Elias Wilderness is a wilderness area located in southeastern Alaska in the United States. At , the Wrangell–Saint Elias Wilderness is the largest designated U.S. Wilderness Area. The wilderness lies within Wrangell–St. Elias National Park and Preserve, the largest national park in the United States.

The wilderness contains the most extensive glaciation in Alaska (with more than 100 glaciers), nine of North America's 16 highest peaks (many over 16,000 feet), the 90-mile-long and 4,000-foot-thick Bagley Icefield (North America's largest subpolar ice field), and the Malaspina Glacier, which spreads 50 percent larger than the state of Delaware.

The wilderness area is part of the Kluane / Wrangell–St. Elias / Glacier Bay / Tatshenshini-Alsek international park system, a UNESCO World Heritage Site, located in Canada and the U.S.

The wilderness is home to many animals, including  Dall sheep, grizzly bears, black bears, coyotes, bison, caribou, wolverines, moose, beavers, mountain goats, gray wolves,  red foxes, and marmots.

See also
Wrangell–St. Elias National Park and Preserve
List of largest wilderness areas in the United States

References

 Wilderness.net (public domain)
 National Park Service
 Alaska National Interests Lands Conservation Act
 Alaska National Interest Lands Conservation Act - Public Law 96-487

ANILCA establishments
Protected areas of Chugach Census Area, Alaska
Protected areas of Copper River Census Area, Alaska
Protected areas of Southeast Fairbanks Census Area, Alaska
Protected areas of Yakutat City and Borough, Alaska
Wilderness areas of Alaska